Flavio is an Italian, Spanish and Portuguese masculine given name, equivalent to Flavius in Latin, Flavi in Catalan, and  Flávio in Portuguese.

People
Flavio Baracchini, Italian World War I fighter ace
Flavio Briatore (1950), Italian businessman
Flavio Calzavara (1900-1981), Italian film director and screenwriter
Flavio Orlandi (1921–2009), Italian politician 
Flavio Roma (born 1974), Italian footballer
Flavio Tosi, Italian politician

Italian masculine given names
Spanish masculine given names